The Faroe Islands, a self-governing nation within the Kingdom of Denmark, is not part of the EU, as explicitly asserted by both Rome treaties.

The relations of the Faroe Islands with the EU are governed by a Fisheries Agreement (1977) and a Free Trade Agreement (1991, revised 1998). The main reason for remaining outside the EU is disagreements about the Common Fisheries Policy.

EU relations
As explicitly asserted by both Rome treaties, the Faroe Islands are not part of the European Union. This means that free movement of goods, people, capital and services within the EU and other directives do not apply for the Faroe Islands.

A protocol to the treaty of accession of Denmark to the European Communities stipulates that Danish nationals residing in the Faroe Islands are not to be considered as Danish nationals within the meaning of the treaties. Hence, Danish people living in the Faroes are not citizens of the European Union (other EU nationals living there remain EU citizens).

The Faroe Islands are not part of the Schengen Area. However, persons travelling between the Faroe Islands and the Schengen Area are not subject to border controls, although there may be identity checks when checking in for flights.

Charges for international services such as phone roaming and bank transfers are much higher than inside the EU.

The relations between EU and Faroe Islands are strained due to the 2013 embargo.

EU boycott against the Faroe Islands 
In July 2013 the EU imposed sanctions on the Faroe Islands due to a dispute over the fishing quota of herring and mackerel. The boycott, which started on 28 August 2013, banned Faroese vessels carrying herring or mackerel from all EU ports, including Denmark, Sweden and Finland. The Faroe Islands could no longer export herring or mackerel to EU countries. The boycott was lifted on 20 August 2014 after a breakthrough in negotiations which saw the Faroese share of the total mackerel quota jump from 4.62% to 12.6%.

Euro adoption
The Faroe Islands utilize a special version of the Danish krone notes that have been printed with text in the Faroese language. It is not a separate currency and can be exchanged 1:1 with the Danish version.  Monetary policy is controlled by the Danish Central Bank. If Denmark does adopt the euro, separate referendums would be required in the Faroe Islands and Greenland to decide whether they should follow suit. Both territories have voted not to be a part of the EU in the past, and their populations will not participate in the Danish euro referendum.  On 5 November 2009 the Faroese Parliament approved a proposal to investigate the possibility for euro adoption, including an evaluation of the legal and economic impact of adopting the euro ahead of Denmark.

EU membership
There are politicians, mainly in the right-wing Union Party (Sambandsflokkurin), led by their chairman Kaj Leo Johannesen, who would like to see the Faroes as a member of the EU. However, the chairman of the left-wing Republic (Tjóðveldi), Høgni Hoydal, has expressed concerns that if the Faroes were to join the EU as is, they might vanish inside the EU, sharing this with the situation of the Shetland Islands and Åland today, and wants the local government to solve the political situation between the Faroes and Denmark first.

A major concern is also fishing, which accounts for 90 percent of Faroese exports. As such a large part of their economy, the islands do not want decisions on it being made so far away as they would have so little say in the EU due to their small population. As an EU member, according to the Common Fisheries Policy they would have to give away large fish quotas in their own waters to other EU countries.

References 

Third-country relations of the European Union
Foreign relations of the Faroe Islands
Contemplated enlargements of the European Union
Denmark and the European Union